The 1953 San Francisco 49ers season was the franchise's 4th season in the National Football League and their 8th overall. They were coming off a 7–5 record in 1952.

The 49ers played consistent football all season long, never losing consecutive games throughout the season en route to a franchise-best 9–3 record. However, the 49ers lost both their games against the Detroit Lions, who finished the season 10–2 to win the Western Conference and earn a spot in the NFL Championship game.

Offensively, San Francisco was led by quarterback Y. A. Tittle, who threw for 2,121 yards and 20 TDs while completing 57.5% of his passes. Running back Joe Perry had another great season, rushing for 1,018 yards along with 10 TDs, while Hugh McElhenny rushed for 503 yards and 3 TDs, and caught 30 passes for 474 yards and 6 TDs. Wide receiver Billy Wilson caught a team-high 51 passes for 840 yards and 10 TDs.

Schedule

Game summaries

Week 1

Standings

Pro Bowl
San Francisco's players selected for the Pro Bowl:

References

External links
1953 49ers on Pro Football Reference
SHRP Sports

San Francisco 49ers seasons
San Francisco 49ers